Albești is a commune in Vaslui County, Western Moldavia, Romania. It is composed of four villages: Albești, Corni-Albești, Crasna and Gura Albești.

Crasna village is a small railway hub on the Tecuci-Iași line, with trains formerly branching off to Huși.

References

Communes in Vaslui County
Localities in Western Moldavia